Live WFMU 91.1 is a live album by Khanate. It was originally broadcast and recorded on 13 April 2002 at WFMU Hoboken, NJ.

The second track, "German Dental Work", is a cover of an Earth song of the same name.

Only 50 CDs in vellum sleeves were released.

Track listing
"Pieces of Quiet"  – 18:45
"German Dental Work"  – 10:18
"No Joy"  – 9:59
"Skin Coat"  – 10:12

2002 live albums
Khanate (band) albums